Wayne McPherson is an Australian former professional rugby league footballer who played in the 1980s. He played for South Sydney, Eastern Suburbs and Illawarra in the NSWRL competition

Playing career
McPherson made his first grade debut for South Sydney in round 5 of the 1980 NSWRFL season against Newtown at Redfern Oval. McPherson was contracted with South Sydney in 1981 and 1982 but only played for the reserve grade team. In 1983, he transferred to the clubs arch-rivals Eastern Suburbs. McPherson played three games for Easts including their fifth place playoff loss to St. George.

In 1984, McPherson joined Illawarra and spent the majority of his playing time there in the fullback role. McPherson's three seasons at Illawarra were not particularly successful as the club finished with back to back Wooden Spoon's in 1985 and 1986.

References

South Sydney Rabbitohs players
Illawarra Steelers players
Sydney Roosters players
Australian rugby league players
Rugby league fullbacks
1961 births
Living people